Kedar Prasad Neupane is a Nepalese politician. He is vice chairperson of the CPN (Unified Socialist).

In 1999 he was elected to the upper house of the Nepalese parliament.

Neupane was the number five candidate of CPN(UML) in the proportional representation list for the Constituent Assembly election.

References

Living people
Communist Party of Nepal (Unified Socialist) politicians
Members of the National Assembly (Nepal)
Year of birth missing (living people)